Erwadi is a village in Ramanathapuram District, Tamil Nadu, a state in South India. It belongs to Kilakarai Taluk and town panchayat. The village is the location of the grave and shrine of Qutbus Sultan Syed Ibrahim Shaheed Badusha, the previous ruler of Medina. Erwadi also belongs to Kadaladi assembly constituency, which is a part of Ramanathapuram (Lok Sabha constituency). However, after the delimitations in 2009, Erwadi has been joined to the Ramanathapuram assembly constituency. Although a small town, Erwadi is the second largest contributor for the revenue of Ramanthapuram District.

History

Importance in Islam

Sultan Syed Ibrahim Shaheed sent Sikandar Badusha to offer Islamic teachings to the Pandiya ruler, Thiru Pandiyan, in Madurai but he refused to accept them and waged war. Shaheed's troops won and Sultan Sikandar Badusha was throned as king in Madurai. Shaheed's troops marched towards Bouthramanickapattinam (Kilakarai). Shaheed Badusha offered Islam to King Vikrama Pandiyan, who vehemently refused and asked Shaheed to leave the kingdom. Shaheed refused to leave without converting them to Islam. Vikrama Pandiyan declared war. A very violent war consisting of about 10 battles, each lasting around 3–4 days, was waged. All of the family members of Shaheed Badusha were killed, including his only son Syed Abu Tahir, his brother Syed Ismail, his brother-in-law Zainul Abideen and many of Shaheed Badusha's martyrs and ministers, including Amir Abbas of Mecca, Abdul Qadir Mujahid, Muhaiyaddeen, Abu Bakr Abdul Hakim, Abdullah, Shamsuddin of Mecca, Qamaruddin, Nooruddeen, Muhammad Yusuf, Jafar Sadiq, Rumi Syed Ahmed, Zulfikar Ali, Chanthana Peer of Persia, Abdul Kadir Gilani, Abdul Qadir Samadaani, Pathan Sahib, Hamza Basheer, Muhammad Mustafa Ahmed, and Uvaisul Hasan Ridwanullahi Ta'ala Alaihim Ajmaeen.
Finally, King Vikrama Pandiyan and his sons Indra Pandiyan and Chandra Pandiyan were killed and Shaheed won the war, claiming the throne of Bouthiramanickapattinam. He ruled the province for twelve years and spread Islam all over south Tamil Nadu. Coins struck during the rule of Sultan Syed Ibrahim Shaheed have been found by archeologists.

Religious importance 
Al Qutbul Hamid wal Gausul Majid Badhusha Sultan Syed Ibrahim Shaheed, king of Medina and 18th generation descendant of the Islamic prophet Muhammad, is said to have traveled to Erwadi, erstwhile Bouthiramanickapattinam, during his journey to India in the early 12th century to spread Islam according to Muhammad's wish.

Ervadi Santhanakoodu Festival

The annual Santhanakoodu festival is held at Ervadi dargha, Ramanathapuram district during the Islamic month of Dhu al-Qi'dah commemorating the shahadat anniversary of Qutb Sulthan Syed Ibrahim Shahid badhusha and is celebrated together by Hindus and Muslims. The Deventhirakula velalar, Yadavas, Parayars, Dalits, Adi Dravidas and the Fishermen community bear the duty of Carrying the Chariot, holding light lamps, putting crackers while the Levvais (Dargah Huqdar Mujavirs) take care of religious duties such as reciting Moulid sheriff, Dua smearing sandal on the roula and praying for the welfare of pilgrims.

Transport
The nearest major town to Erwadi is Kilakarai, at a distance of 27 km, which itself falls on NH 49 from Madurai to Rameswaram. Ramanathapuram is the nearest railway station, connecting the village to all major cities in Tamil Nadu. Erwadi is well connected with the border ports of Bay of Bengal as a junction point of fishing steamers.

Education
Following is a list of schools in Erwadi:

 Panchayat Union Middle School
 S.A.B.M.H Government Higher Secondary School
 Elite Matriculation school
 Kadaladi Union Middle School Chinna Ervadi

See also

 Karseri
 Kattupalli
 List of Islamic shrines in Tamil Nadu
 Madurai Maqbara
 Manamadurai
 Meesal
 Melakkal
 Natham (Keelakarai)
 Palli chandai
 Sundaramudayan
 Thachu oorani
 Thiruparankundram
 Thiruparankundram Dargah
 Thiruvedagam
 Vaippar
 Valinokkam

References

External links
 
 360o travel view of Erwadi's main dargah published by Tamil national daily Dinamalar

Sufi shrines in India
Villages in Ramanathapuram district
Ziyarat
Erwadi-related dargahs
Dargahs in Tamil Nadu